The 2010–11 season was Dunfermline Athletic's 4th and final season in the Scottish First Division after being relegated from the Scottish Premier League in 2007. On 30 April 2011, the Pars beat Morton to seal promotion back to the SPL.

Pre-season

During preseason manager Jim McIntyre made two goalkeeper signings to bolster the squad. He signed Chris Smith, after his excellent performance on loan from St Mirren, and Kyle Allison as back up. Also signed are Ross County's Alex Keddie and Pat Clarke from Dundee. Pre-season results were awful including a 5-1 hammering by a Manchester United reserve squad.

League table

Top goalscorers

Disciplinary record

Match results

Division Summary

Friendlies

League

Scottish League Cup

Scottish Challenge Cup

Scottish Cup

Transfers

In

Out

See also
 2010–11 Scottish First Division
 2010–11 Scottish Cup
 2010–11 Scottish League Cup
 2010–11 in Scottish football

References

External links
 Official Site: 2010–11 fixtures
 BBC Sport - Club Stats
 Soccerbase - Results | Squad stats | Transfers

2010-11
Dunfermline Athletic